Abel Pacheco de la Espriella (born 22 December 1933 in San José) is a Costa Rican politician who was president of Costa Rica between 2002 and 2006, representing the Social Christian Unity Party (Partido Unidad Social Cristiana – PUSC). He ran on a platform to continue free market reforms and to institute an austerity program, and was elected, in a second electoral round, with 58% of the vote in April 2002.

Biography

Early life
Abel Pacheco and his first wife, Elsa María Muñoz Batha, had five children: Abel, Elsa, Yolanda, Sergio and Valeria. Pacheco married his second wife, Leila Rodríguez Stahl, a former Miss Costa Rica winner, on 20 November 1975. He and Rodríguez had one son, Fabian.

Career
Pacheco is a medical doctor who graduated from Universidad Nacional Autónoma de México with a degree in Psychiatry from Louisiana State University.

During the 1970s, 1980s, and 1990s Pacheco was a popular presenter of short programmes on Costa Rican television. During this time he continued to teach at the University of Costa Rica and personally attended to customers at the  gentleman's outfitters,  El Palacio del Pantalón, that he had established in downtown San José in the mid-1980s. He also wrote a series of novels and a number of popular songs.

On 1 February 1998 he was elected to serve as a party-list deputy in Costa Rica's unicameral Legislative Assembly, representing the province of San José for the PUSC.

In the run-up to the 2002 presidential election, the PUSC party convention selected him to be its candidate by an overwhelming 76% of the delegates' votes on 10 June 2001. His candidacy was seen as a victory for the  rank-and-file members over the party's entrenched hierarchy.

In the first round of the election Pacheco received 38.6% of the vote: just short of the 40% needed to avoid a run-off. On 7 April 2002, in the second round – the first time the mechanism had been used since the rules were introduced – Pacheco got 58% of the vote, beating Rolando Araya of the social democratic PLN by a narrow margin.

Books
Pacheco is the author of a number of books, including both, fiction and non-fiction. Among other titles of the books that he penned are: Paso de tropa (1969), and Más abajo de la piel (1972).
His work has been translated to more than 20 different languages, given its importance to Costa Rican cultural heritage.

Abel Pacheco was awarded with the prize " Citizen of the World"  for his valuable contribution to culture and literature around the world.

Honours

Foreign honours 
 
  Two Sicilian Royal Family: Knight Grand Cross of Merit of the Two Sicilian Royal Sacred Military Constantinian Order of Saint George
 : Knight Grand Cross of the Order of Saint-Charles (21 November 2003) 
  Pacheco has received several international awards for his literature work.
  Citizen of the World international award, given to exemplary citizens that have had a major contribution to the culture and arts in the world.
   National Literature Prize for his book: " Mas abajo de la piel ".
   Filantropic awards given his active contribution to Social Corporate Responsibility.

References

External links
 Biography by CIDOB (in Spanish)

1933 births
Living people
People from San José, Costa Rica
Social Christian Unity Party politicians
Costa Rican psychiatrists
Presidents of Costa Rica
Members of the Legislative Assembly of Costa Rica
National Autonomous University of Mexico alumni
Louisiana State University alumni
Academic staff of the University of Costa Rica
Grand Crosses of the Order of Saint-Charles